Route 134 is a highway in the province of Quebec, running from Candiac on the South Shore of the Saint Lawrence River to Montreal, crossing the river on Jacques Cartier Bridge. On the South Shore, Route 134 is named Taschereau Boulevard (boulevard Taschereau), after the prominent Quebec family that included former premier Louis-Alexandre Taschereau. From Jacques Cartier Bridge to the end of the highway at Sherbrooke Street (Quebec Route 138) in Montreal, the highway is a one-way pair formed by Papineau Avenue and De Lorimier Avenue.

Municipalities along Route 134

 Candiac
 La Prairie
 Brossard
 Longueuil
 Borough of Le Vieux-Longueuil
 Borough of Saint-Hubert
 Borough of Greenfield Park
 Montreal

See also
List of Quebec provincial highways

References

External links
 Interactive Provincial Route Map (Transports Québec) 

134
Roads in Montreal